The 2018 World of Outlaws Craftsman Late Model Series is the 17th season of dirt late model racing sanctioned by the World of Outlaws. It is also the 30th anniversary since the series was originally formed in 1988. The season began with the Winter Freeze at Screven Motor Speedway on February 9, and will end with the Textron Off Road World of Outlaws World Finals at The Dirt Track at Charlotte on November 3. Brandon Sheppard entered the season as the defending champion and Mike Marlar won the 2018 championship.

Teams and drivers

Complete schedule

Schedule
DIRTvision.com will broadcast all races with live radio coverage, along with select races with live video coverage.

 ≠ - the race was postponed or canceled
 ≈ - will state if the race is not for championship points

Schedule notes and changes
 The Winter Freeze races at Screven Motor Speedway on February 9-10 were canceled due to weather conditions. 
 The Tennessee Tipoff races at Smoky Mountain Speedway on March 9-10 was postponed due to weather conditions. The 2 races were rescheduled on April 27 & 28. 
 The Illini 100 at Farmer City Raceway (March 23-24, later postponed to April 13-14) was canceled due to weather conditions. 
 The Outlaw Invasion at Atomic Speedway (May 18-19) was postponed to September 28-29 due to weather.

Results and standings

Races

See also
 2018 World of Outlaws Craftsman Sprint Car Series
 2018 Super DIRTcar Series

References

World of Outlaws Late Model Series seasons
World of Outlaws Craftsman Late Model Series